{{DISPLAYTITLE:C27H35NO4}}
The molecular formula C27H35NO4 (molar mass: 437.57 g/mol, exact mass: 437.2566 u) may refer to:

 Alletorphine, or N-allylnoretorphine
 Levonantradol